The Branstetter Rocks are a small group of rocks lying  east-northeast of Thil Island in the eastern part of the Amery Ice Shelf. They were delineated in 1952 by John H. Roscoe from air photos taken by U.S. Navy Operation Highjump (1946–47), and named by him for J.C. Branstetter, an air crewman on Operation Highjump photographic flights in the area.

References 

Rock formations of Princess Elizabeth Land